The Civil Lines is a residential area and one of the 3 subdivisions of the Central Delhi district of Delhi in India. It is one of the 12 zones under the Municipal Corporation of Delhi. It was the hub of European-style hotels in the city until New Delhi came into being in 1911. The official residence of the Lieutenant Governor of Delhi is also located at Raj  Niwas Marg, Civil Lines.

History

The name Civil Lines is a relic of British Raj times, when the city of Delhi was organized into separate areas where the British military and civilian buildings were located. Areas, where civilians lived, were demarcated as Civil Lines. One monument of the British Raj era is the Metcalfe House, Delhi. This is where the administration and governance of the Indian Empire were conducted by nineteen Governor Generals (Viceroys) from Charles Hardinge to Lord Irwin at their offices housed in the Old Secretariat building on the Alipore Road, and the residence of these Governor Generals was the prestigious bungalow at 1.Alipore Road which was vacated by the British Indian government in 1930 to relocate the residence for succeeding viceroys at a palatial complex on the Raisina hill in Lutyens' Delhi known as the Viceroy's House. The bungalow at 1. Alipore Road today houses the Indra Prastha College for Women. The Old Secretariat after 1931 housed the offices of the British Indian Army and the Post Master General and the adjoining Army Press. After independence, It became the seat of Delhi's Metropolitan Council and currently houses several offices of the Central Government like the Publications Department and offices of the Delhi Administration. The Viceroy's House today is the official residence of the Presidents of the Indian Republic and is called the Rashtrapati Bhawan. The offices of the Old Secretariat at Alipore Road were also relocated in 1931 to the New Secretarial Building at Lutyens' Delhi adjoining the Vice Roy's House and is called the Central Secretariat today. One of the earliest modern hotels in Delhi was the Maidens Hotel, later Oberoi Maidens, built-in 1903. It was situated in the Civil Lines, where all European-style hotels were situated and the officers of British Raj stayed. Other hotels in the area were Swiss Hotel and Hotel Cecil, run by Robert Hotz family, which also owned Wildflower Hall and Cecil Hotel in Shimla. Hotel Cecil was later demolished and today St. Xavier's School stands on the location.

Raj Niwas, the official residence of the Lieutenant Governor of Delhi, the head of state of Delhi and National Capital Territory of Delhi, is located on Raj Niwas Marg in Civil Lines. A children's home run by Mother Teresa's Missionaries of Charity lies north of Qudsia Bagh in Civil Lines. Civil Lines is quite a big area consisting of various colonies and offices. One of the main colonies is Delhi Police Staff Quarters which is just behind the Civil Lines Police Station.

Civil Lines is connected to Delhi University North Campus.
It is now a developing district. It includes areas like:

 Ata-ur-Rehman Lane
 Court Road
 Bhiku Ram Jain Marg (erstwhile Rajpur Road)
 Sham Nath Marg (erstwhile Alipore Road)
 Lala Bansidhar Gupta Road (erstwhile Under Hill Road) 
 Under Hill Lane
 Police Lines
 Shankracharya Marg
 Bela Road
 Nuruddin Ahmad Lane
 Raj Narain Road
 Maharaja Lal Lane
 Battery Lane
 Prof. MM Agarwal Marg (erstwhile Jamna Marg/ Yamuna Road)
 Raj Niwas Road
 Sri Ram Road
 Flagstaff Road
 North End Road
 Racquet Court Road
 Ram Kishore Road
 Khyber Pass Market
 Magazine Road
 Sant Parmanand Hospital
 Tirath Ram Shah Hospital
 Aruna Asaf Ali Hospital
 The National Institute of Communicable Diseases 
 The Indra Prastha College for Women

Surrounding areas
 Delhi University, North Campus
 Mukherjee Nagar: an educational hub, mostly known for S.S.C and I.A.S. coachings. It used to have a famous Batra Cinema.
 Kingsway Camp: the main road of G.T.B. Nagar. It is a very congested market.
 Timarpur: residential bungalows and multi-story apartment blocks of the Central Government and the Delhi Administration employee. It includes a private residential colony called the Benarasi Dass Estate aka the BD Estate 
 BD Estate Market. It also houses the Delhi Metro Khyber Pass Terminal and train maintenance yards. Site for an upcoming large multi-story private residential complex called La Tropicana.
 Radio Colony: a housing colony for employees of All India Radio
 Dhir Pur: a small and congested village near Rosary School
 Dhaka Village: a concentration of rental housing for students
 Gandhi Ashram, Delhi: a green open area, sometimes having a "Khadi Mela". Once Mahatma Gandhi visited it.
 Parmanand Colony: Most of the Sikhs and Punjabis live here.
 Model Town: an affluent neighborhood with a popular shopping district with many branded showrooms
 Munshi Ram Colony/Dairy: a residential area adjacent to Parade Marg and Sant Nirankari Public School
 Nirankari Colony

Transport
The Civil Lines underground station of the Delhi Metro services the area. The station harbors the yellow line. This residential area is also close to Kashmere Gate metro station, which harbors three metro lines.
Interstate Bus Terminal (ISBT) is very close to the colony.

Civil Lines to Connaught Place: 10 mins by Metro and 15–20 mins by Road.
Civil Lines to Delhi Airport: 35–40 mins by car.
Inter State Bus Terminal (ISBT) at Kashmere Gate, which provides bus service to points in other states, is a 5 min drive.
Old Delhi Railway Station: 5–6 mins by Metro and 10–12 mins by Road.
New Delhi Railway Station: 8–10 mins by Metro and 20–25 mins by Road.

Restaurants

 Romeo Lane
 L'opera
 Best of Asia Village

Shops

 24SEVEN

Hotels 

 Oberoi Maidens Hotel
 Gujrati Samaj

Notable people 
 Residence of the current Chief Minister of Delhi, Arvind Kejriwal
 Residence of the Lieutenant Governor of Delhi
 Residence of Late Qimat Rai Gupta (founder of Havells) and Anil Rai Gupta, MD Havells India
 Residence of Late PN Dhar (Economic Advisor to Late Indra Gandhi) and Late Sheila Dhar (Noted Author and Cultural Icon of Delhi)
 Residence of Yuvraj Narayan, Group Deputy CEO, Board Member and CFO, DP World, Dubai
 Residence of Sumant Kathpalia, CEO IndusInd Bank
 Residence of Arvind Kathpalia, President and Group Chief Risk Officer, Kotak Mahindra Bank
 Former Residence of Sekhar Bahadur, Vice Chairman - Global Banking, Deutsche Bank
 Former Residence of Madhav Dhar, Founder and Former Head, Morgan Stanley Emerging Markets Division
 Former Residence of Noted Journalist Vinod Dua and Comedian Mallika Dua
 Food writer and TV personality Madhur Jaffrey was born here.

See also 
 Civil Lines, Allahabad
 Civil Lines (magazine)
 Civil Lines, Rawalpindi
 Civil Lines, Faisalabad

References

Neighbourhoods in Delhi
North Delhi district
District subdivisions of Delhi